The Rain is a 1976 Bengali-Urdu bilingual Bangladeshi film which stars Wasim and Olivia in lead roles. The film earned two awards at the 2nd Bangladesh National Film Awards.

Soundtrack Bangla

Soundtrack Urdu

Awards 
2nd Bangladesh National Film Awards
 Best Male Playback Singer - Mahmudunnabi;
 Best Female Playback Singer - Runa Laila

References

External links 
 

1976 films
Bengali-language Bangladeshi films
Urdu-language Bangladeshi films
Films scored by Anwar Pervez (musician)
1970s Bengali-language films